Club Destroyers is a football club from Santa Cruz, Bolivia currently playing in the second division Copa Simón Bolívar. The club was founded September 14, 1948, and they play their home games at the Estadio Ramón Tahuichi Aguilera. Destroyers competed in the top-flight Liga de Fútbol Profesional Boliviano from 1985–99 and 2005–07, and played in the first two seasons of the top-flight Division Profesional from 2018 to 2019.

The club won its first professional title when they won the Second Division in 2004.

Achievements

National honours
First Division – Professional Era: 0
First Division – Semiprofessional Era: 2
1965, 1966

Second Division, Copa Simón Bolívar: 1
2004
Runners-up: 2012, 2016–17

Current squad

References 

 
Association football clubs established in 1948
Destroyers
1948 establishments in Bolivia